Various national symbols of Somalia include: